The 2011 Canterbury-Bankstown Bulldogs season is the 77th in the club's history. They are competing in the National Rugby League's 2011 Telstra Cup Premiership under coach Jim Dymock after Kevin Moore stepped down from the position on 14 July 2011 . The Canterbury-Bankstown Bulldogs finished the regular season in 9th place, failing to qualify for the finals.

Telstra Premiership

Draw and Results

Ladder

Players

2011 Squad

*Flags mean countries that players represent.

Player movements

Signings
Aiden Tolman from Melbourne Storm
Trent Hodkinson from Manly-Warringah Sea Eagles
Kris Keating from Parramatta Eels
Frank Pritchard from Penrith Panthers
Greg Eastwood from Leeds Rhinos
Michael Lett from St George Illawarra Dragons
Grant Millington from Cronulla Sharks
Jonathon Wright from Parramatta Eels

Transfers/Leaving
Luke Patten to Salford City Reds
Ben Hannant to Brisbane Broncos
Brett Kimmorley retired
Jarrad Hickey released
Danny Williams released
Yileen Gordon to Penrith Panthers
 Blake Green to Hull Kingston Rovers
 Tim Winitana to Penrith Panthers
 Ratu Tagive to Wests Tigers
 Nathan Massey to Canberra Raiders
 Daniel Harrison to Manly Sea Eagles
 Ryan Tandy released

Re-Signed
Ben Barba till 2015
Michael Hodgson till 2011
Andrew Ryan till 2011
David Stagg till 2012
Jake Foster till 2013
Corey Payne till 2013
Josh Morris till 2014
Michael Ennis Till 2014

See also
 List of Canterbury-Bankstown Bulldogs seasons

References

External links 
Canterbury-Bankstown Bulldogs

Canterbury-Bankstown Bulldogs seasons
Canterbury-Bankstown Bulldogs season